Jabour is a surname. Notable people with the surname include:

Anya Jabour, American historian
Lenni Jabour (born 1970), Canadian singer-songwriter 
Marwan Jabour (born 1977), a former captive held in the CIA's network of black sites
Paul Jabour (born 1956), American politician